Mudbound is a 2017 American historical drama film directed by Dee Rees. It was written by Rees and Virgil Williams, who based their screenplay on the 2008 novel Mudbound by Hillary Jordan. It stars Carey Mulligan, Garrett Hedlund, Jason Clarke, Jason Mitchell, Jonathan Banks, Rob Morgan and Mary J. Blige. The film depicts two World War II veterans – one white, one black – who return to rural Mississippi each to address racism and PTSD in his own way. The film premiered at the 2017 Sundance Film Festival on January 21, 2017, and was released on Netflix and in limited release on November 17, 2017.

Critics praised its screenplay and direction, and the cast's performances. At the 75th Golden Globe Awards it received nominations for Best Supporting Actress (Blige) and Best Original Song ("Mighty River"). At the 90th Academy Awards, the film earned four nominations: Best Supporting Actress for Blige; Best Original Song for Blige, Raphael Saadiq and Taura Stinson (Blige became the first person to ever be nominated for both acting and songwriting in the same year); Best Adapted Screenplay for Rees and Virgil Williams (Rees became the first Black woman to ever be nominated) and Best Cinematography, which made Rachel Morrison the first woman to ever be nominated in the category.

Plot 
In the Mississippi Delta, white brothers Henry and Jamie McAllan dig a grave during a rainstorm and struggle to lower their deceased father's coffin into it. When the Jacksons, a black sharecropper family pass by in a wagon, Henry asks the father, Hap, for help. Henry seems uncomfortable asking and Hap hesitates to reply.

A few years prior, Henry is conned out of renting a home and is forced to live near sharecroppers on a farm outside the town of Marietta, Mississippi and moves there with his wife Laura, their daughters, and his virulently racist father, Pappy. The Jackson family, led by tenant farmer Hap and his wife Florence, work the farm's cotton field and dream of owning their own land one day. As World War II begins, Jamie and the Jacksons' eldest son, Ronsel, join the United States Army Air Corps and U.S. Army, respectively. Both men experience severe war trauma in the European theater as Jamie flies B-25 bombers and Ronsel commands tanks. Ronsel also falls in love with a white German woman. Meanwhile, in Mississippi both families continue to live in poverty and support each other out of necessity. When the Jacksons' mule has to be euthanized, Henry offers to rent out his mule but exacts half of the Jacksons' crop in payment; leaving the Jacksons no choice but to accept. Florence also helps the McAllan family when their two young daughters fall ill with whooping cough; and then Laura offers Florence work to help care for her daughters permanently. Hap, who serves as the preacher for the local black community, falls while helping to build a church, breaking his leg and rendering him unable to work his fields. Laura sneaks money from her husband's safe so Hap can be properly treated by a doctor, much to Henry's disapproval and causing their passionless marriage to worsen.

When the war ends, Ronsel and Jamie return home and realize that they have changed but the Mississippi Delta has not. Jamie becomes an alcoholic and suffers from PTSD. Ronsel, accustomed to the relative lack of racism among Europeans, struggles with racism in Mississippi. They become aware of each other's difficulties and bond over their war experiences. Ronsel questions why Jamie treats him with respect, and Jamie recounts that on a bomber mission a black fighter pilot saved his life. Jamie grows close to Laura but his alcoholism worsens and he drunkenly crashes his truck. Henry leaves on a trip and tells Jamie to depart from the farm before he returns. Ronsel receives a letter and photo from the German woman with whom he had been romantically involved and learns that they had a child together and she wants him to come to Europe. The photo is of her and their bi-racial child. Ronsel shares this with Jamie while driving together when their truck passes Pappy, and Ronsel is forced to duck down to hide. Pappy confronts Jamie about him socializing with Ronsel and scolds him for his drunken behavior and sneers at Laura, claiming she has romantic feelings for Jamie. Later, Ronsel realizes that he lost the photograph that Pappy finds in the truck. Laura confronts Jamie as he prepares to leave and they have sex.

As Ronsel frantically searches for his photograph, he is ambushed and beaten by Pappy and members of the Ku Klux Klan. Pappy brings Jamie to a barn where the Klan is preparing to kill Ronsel for fathering a child with a white woman. Jamie points a gun at his father in an effort to save his friend and is also beaten by the Klan. As Jamie is restrained, he is told to choose Ronsel's punishment for his crime — to lose his eyes, tongue or testicles; or death. Through the pain, Jamie whispers "tongue" and Ronsel's tongue is cut out. Ronsel is left bound and wounded for his family to find. Later that night, Jamie wakes Pappy who had previously belittled Jamie's war experience because he had not looked into the eyes of the people he killed during the war. Jamie looks Pappy in the eye and smothers him with a pillow.

The following day, the Jacksons appear to be leaving with their meager belongings in the wagon when they pass Henry and Jamie who are struggling to bury Pappy. Hap accedes to Henry's request to help with the coffin and says a prayer over the grave. In a rebuke to Pappy's wickedness, Hap recites from the Book of Job, verses 14:2–12. Jamie approaches the Jacksons' wagon and gives the German woman's letter to Florence, asking her to give it to Ronsel.

Much later, Jamie moves to the city. Ronsel returns to Europe and reunites with his German lover and their son.

Cast 

 Carey Mulligan as Laura McAllan (née Chappell), wife of Henry
 Garrett Hedlund as Jamie McAllan, brother of Henry
 Jason Clarke as Henry McAllan, brother of Jamie
 Mary J. Blige as Florence Jackson, wife of  Hap
 Rob Morgan as Hap Jackson
 Jason Mitchell as Ronsel Jackson, son of Hap
 Jonathan Banks as Pappy McAllan, father of  Jamie and Henry
 Frankie Smith as Marlon Jackson
 Kennedy Derosin as Lilly May Jackson
 Elizabeth Windley as Amanda Leigh McAllan
 Piper Blaire as Isabelle McAllan
 Jason Kirkpatrick as Orris Stokes
 Kerry Cahill as Rose Tricklebank
 Oyeleke Oluwafolakanmi as Cleve
 Kelvin Harrison Jr. as Weeks
 Lucy Faust as Vera Atwood
 Dylan Arnold as Carl Atwood
 Samantha Hoefer as Resl
 Geraldine Singer as Mrs. Chappell
 Henry Frost as Teddy Chappell
 Claudio Laniado as Dr. Pearlman
 Charley Vance as Sheriff Thacker

Production 
Development on the film was announced on March 21, 2016, with Dee Rees engaged as director and Carey Mulligan, Garrett Hedlund, Jason Clarke and Jason Mitchell cast in roles. On May 25, Mary J. Blige was added to the cast. On May 31, Jonathan Banks and Rob Morgan were cast, and filming began in New Orleans, Louisiana and post-production started in the United Kingdom by July 2016.

Cinematography 
Dee Rees asked Rachel Morrison to focus on "the idea of the American dream vs. the American reality," so Rachel turned to books by Farm Security Administration photographers for reference points regarding color and composition, in particular Dorothea Lange, Arthur Rothstein, Ben Shahn and Walker Evans. Another primary source for her was a Gordon Parks essay in Life magazine in the 1950s called "A Segregation Story" – regarding color that "felt period, but it didn't feel washed-out". Rachel's term for the goal they tried to achieve is "subjective naturalism," which she describes as first of all, real, and then potentially dramatized with light at main plot points – but remaining real throughout. Through that reality, the focus was on the elements in the picture and not the period itself: "The period wasn't a character in this film. The mud was a character, the weather was a character, the house was a character ... we were trying to make more of a commentary about just how tough times were through experiences." A. O. Scott in the New York Times on the result: "Rachel ... brings the soil, the flora and the weather to life in a way that emphasizes the archaic, elemental power of the story."

Release 
Following its 2017 Sundance Film Festival premiere, Mudbound had distribution offers from A24 and Annapurna Pictures. On January 29, 2017, Netflix acquired distribution rights to the film. The film premiered on the streaming platform, as well as began a one-week theatrical release in New York City and Los Angeles, on November 17, 2017.

Critical response 
On Rotten Tomatoes, the film has an approval rating of 97% based on 199 reviews, with an average rating of 8.20/10. The site's critical consensus reads, "Mudbound offers a well-acted, finely detailed snapshot of American history whose scenes of rural class struggle resonate far beyond their period setting." On Metacritic the film has a weighted average score of 85 out of 100, based on 44 critics, indicating "universal acclaim".

Richard Roeper of the Chicago Sun-Times gave the film 3.5 out of 4 stars, praising the cast and direction. Writing for Rolling Stone, Peter Travers also gave the film 3.5 out of 4 stars, praising Blige's performance and Rees' direction, saying: "The director and her cinematographer Rachel Morrison do wonders with the elements that batter the people of every race and social class in the Delta. But it's the storm raging inside these characters that rivets our attention and makes Mudbound a film that grabs you and won't let go."

In 2019, The A.V. Club named Mudbound on its list of the 100 best movies of the 2010s.

Accolades

See also
 List of black films of the 2010s

References

External links 

 Mudbound at Netflix
 

2017 drama films
2010s historical drama films
African-American drama films
American historical drama films
American World War II films
English-language Netflix original films
Films about the Ku Klux Klan
Films about post-traumatic stress disorder
Films about racism
Films about veterans
Films based on American novels
Films directed by Dee Rees
Films scored by Tamar-kali
Films set in Germany
Films set in Mississippi
Films shot in New Orleans
Patricide in fiction
2010s English-language films
2010s American films